The 2020–21 Western Illinois Leathernecks men's basketball team represented Western Illinois University in the 2020–21 NCAA Division I men's basketball season. The Leathernecks, led by first-year head coach Rob Jeter, played their home games at Western Hall in Macomb, Illinois, as members of the Summit League.

Previous season
The Leathernecks finished the 2019–20 season 5–21, 2–14 in Summit League play to finish in last place. They failed to qualify for the Summit League tournament.

On March 3, 2020, the school announced that head coach Billy Wright's contract would not be renewed. He finished at Western Illinois with a six-year record of 53–115. On March 30, the school announced former Milwaukee head coach Rob Jeter would be hired as the new head coach.

Roster

Schedule and results

|-
!colspan=12 style=| Non-conference regular season

|-
!colspan=9 style=| Summit League regular season

|-
!colspan=9 style=| Summit League tournament

|-

Source

References

Western Illinois Leathernecks men's basketball seasons
Western Illinois Leathernecks
Western Illinois Leathernecks men's basketball
Western Illinois Leathernecks men's basketball